Adélaïde H. Edith Bignon Fassinou (born September 15, 1955, in Porto-Novo) is a Beninese writer and Benin's General Secretary for UNESCO. She has written four novels in French. Her married name is Allagbada.

Publications
 Modukpè, le rêve brisé. Paris: L'Harmattan (Collection Encres Noires no 194), 2000. (130 pp.). . Novel.
 Yémi ou le miracle de l'amour. Cotonou (Bénin): Editions du Flamboyant, 2000 (142 pp.). . 
 L'Oiseau messager. Cotonou: Editions Ruisseaux d'Afrique, 2002 (24 pp.). .
 Toute une vie ne suffirait pas pour en parler. Paris: L'Harmattan, 2002 (194 pp.). . Nouvelles. 
 Enfant d'autrui, fille de personne. Cotonou: Editions du Flamboyant, 2003 (172 pp.). . Roman.
 Jeté en pâture. Paris: L'Harmattan, 2005 (228 pp.). . Roman. 
 La petite fille des eaux. Bertoua/Cameroun: Editions Ndzé: 2006 (96 pp.). . Roman (co-written with 10 other writers).

References

1955 births
Living people
20th-century women writers
20th-century novelists
21st-century women writers
21st-century novelists
Beninese women writers
Beninese novelists
Women novelists